Potoče is a settlement in the Municipality of Preddvor in the Upper Carniola region of Slovenia.

Castle

Just outside the settlement stands Turn Castle, the birthplace of Josipina Turnograjska.

Church
The local church, built on a hill above the settlement, is dedicated to Saint James.

References

External links
Potoče at Geopedia.si

Populated places in the Municipality of Preddvor